Wayne Township is one of nine townships in Starke County, in the U.S. state of Indiana. As of the 2010 census, its population was 4,541 and it contained 1,938 housing units.

Geography

Cities, towns, villages
 North Judson

Unincorporated towns
 Lena Park at 
(This list is based on USGS data and may include former settlements.)

Adjacent townships
 Jackson Township (north)
 Center Township (northeast)
 California Township (east)
 Franklin Township, Pulaski County (southeast)
 Rich Grove Township, Pulaski County (south)
 Cass Township, Pulaski County (southwest)
 Railroad Township (west)

Cemeteries
The township contains these three cemeteries: Hepner, Highland and Saint Thomas.

Airports and landing strips
 Long Airport

Major highways

Education
 North Judson-San Pierre School Corporation

Wayne Township is served by the North Judson-Wayne Township Library.

Political districts
 Indiana's 2nd congressional district
 State House District 17
 State Senate District 5

References
 United States Census Bureau 2008 TIGER/Line Shapefiles
 United States Board on Geographic Names (GNIS)
 IndianaMap

External links
 Indiana Township Association
 United Township Association of Indiana

Townships in Starke County, Indiana
Townships in Indiana